The vestibular ganglion (also called Scarpa's ganglion) is the ganglion of the vestibular nerve. It is located inside the internal auditory meatus.

The ganglion contains the cell bodies of bipolar neurons whose peripheral processes form synaptic contact with hair cells of the vestibular sensory end organs. These include hair cells of the cristae ampullares of the semicircular duct and macula in the utricle and saccule.

It is named for Antonio Scarpa.

At birth, it is already close to its final size.

References

External links
 Diagram (in French)
 Histology at wustl.edu

Vestibulocochlear nerve
Vestibular system